The 2013 NCAA Division I Football Championship Game was a postseason college football game between the North Dakota State Bison and the Sam Houston State Bearkats. It was played on January 5, 2013, at FC Dallas Stadium in Frisco, Texas. The culminating game of the 2012 NCAA Division I FCS football season, it was won by North Dakota State, 39–13.

With sponsorship by Enterprise Rent-A-Car, the game was officially known as the NCAA FCS Championship presented by Enterprise Rent-A-Car. The contest was a rematch of the prior season's championship game, which was also won by North Dakota State.

Teams
The participants of the Championship Game were the finalists of the 2012 FCS Playoffs, which began with a 20-team bracket.

North Dakota State Bison

North Dakota State finished their regular season with a 10–1 record (7–1 in conference), including a win over Colorado State of the FBS. As the first-seed in the tournament, the Bison defeated South Dakota State, Wofford, and fifth-seed Georgia Southern to reach the final. This was North Dakota State's second appearance in an FCS/Division I-AA title game, having won the prior season's title game over Sam Houston State.

Sam Houston State Bearkats

Sam Houston State finished their regular season with an 8–3 record (6–1 in conference). Two of their losses were to FBS teams; Baylor and Texas A&M. Unseeded in the tournament, the Bearkats defeated Cal Poly, third-seed Montana State, and second-seed Eastern Washington to reach the final. This was also Sam Houston State's second appearance in an FCS/Division I-AA championship game, having lost the prior season's title game to North Dakota State.

Game summary
Both teams scored a field goal and touchdown in the first half, for a 10–10 score at halftime. The Bearkats appeared to take the lead on a 41-yard run by Timothy Flanders early in the third quarter, but the score was negated by a holding penalty. The Bison went on to score four second-half touchdowns, while holding the Bearkats to a single field goal. The 39–13 final score gave the Bison their second FCS championship.

Scoring summary

Game statistics

References

Further reading

External links
 Box score at ESPN
 College Football NCAA FCS Division I North Dakota State vs Sam Houston State 01 05 2013 via YouTube

Championship Game
NCAA Division I Football Championship Games
North Dakota State Bison football games
Sam Houston Bearkats football games
American football in the Dallas–Fort Worth metroplex
Sports in Frisco, Texas
NCAA Division I Football Championship Game
NCAA Division I Football Championship Game